Cardiff High School is a comprehensive school in the Cyncoed area of Cardiff, Wales. Stephen Jones has been Headteacher since 2011. It has been rated as Excellent for current performance and Excellent for prospects for improvement by Estyn (2013) the school achieved its highest ever results in 2016 with 92% of students achieving Level 2+ (5 GCSEs including English and Mathematics) and a 100% achieving at least 5 GCSEs.

History 
Although the school was established in its current form in 1970, its origins go back much further to the foundations of the three schools that merged to form the present school.

City of Cardiff High Schools 

City of Cardiff High School for Girls was opened in January 1895 in the Parade, Cardiff, with Mary Collin as its first headmistress, and City of Cardiff High School for Boys was opened in September 1898 in Newport Road, Cardiff. Both were created under the terms of the Welsh Intermediate Education Act 1889 and therefore were originally called Cardiff Intermediate School for Girls and Cardiff Intermediate School for Boys respectively.

From 1905, secondary school education in Cardiff was largely provided through a system of Municipal Secondary Schools that were organised under the Education Act 1902. Although the Intermediate Schools were both rebranded as high schools in 1911 (thus the schools became Cardiff High School for Girls and Cardiff High School for Boys) they suffered in comparison with the municipal secondary schools because of their entrance examinations and later their fees, particularly after the municipal secondary schools abolished fees in 1924.

The working-class intake of the schools was limited because parents were deterred by the fees, only partly made up by scholarships and bursaries, and later by the regime and curriculum of the grammar school. When the United Kingdom Government passed the Education Act 1944, the Tripartite System was established, dividing secondary schools into three categories, the grammar school, the secondary technical school and the secondary modern school. The grammar school was deemed the place of education for the academically gifted (as determined by the 11-plus), and the high schools were selected to become the grammar schools (hence, the informal term Cardiff Grammar School applied to both).

The boys' school had from an early stage suffered with a constricted site on Newport Road. Within three years of its foundation, a new site acquired in 1901 on the corner of Corbett Road and Park Place, but the school eventually stayed on its original site, with a new school opened in 1910 and further extensions in 1931–32.

Cardiff High School formed by merger 

The school was unified on a single site in 1973. The Newport Road site of the former High School was eventually sold to fund an extension to Willows High School in Tremorfa, Cardiff.

The accommodation in 1973 consisted of the old Ty Celyn School Llandennis Road, Cardiff, with a new building attached, designed for six form entry. A considerable amount of internal alteration has been carried out on the original building. An extension was completed in December 2013 which added a state of the art multi purpose space; Neuadd Celyn which is used for dramatic and theatrical performances, new Music classrooms and [sound proofed] practice areas, a suite of History classrooms, Art Classrooms.

In 2014, the Sixth Form Centre [relocated] to Ty Celyn and was renovated to provide a designated centre exclusively for sixth form students. TY Celyn houses the Sixth Form Achievement Team, including Head of School, Achievement Leaders, UCAS co-ordinator and Sixth Form administrator as well as providing study facilities, recreational, and relaxation space for sixth form students.

Cardiff High School became a seven form entry school in September 1998, when a third feeder primary school, Roath Park, was added to the two existing feeder schools, Lakeside and Rhydypenau.  In 2011, Marlborough Primary was added as a fourth partner school (the 'Feeder School' criterion no longer being considered for admission purposes) as the school increased to an eight form intake. As of 2016, it has a total pupil roll of 1635, of whom 450 are in the sixth form.

The school enjoys an extremely high level of parental interest and support. The establishment of a new Cardiff High Partnership with parents in 1998 both built on the strong, existing Parents' Association links, and launched new initiatives, including a covenant scheme. It also expanded the range of educational, social and fundraising activities.

According to the latest inspection report by Estyn, the school is rated as Excellent and, 'the standards achieved by pupils are consistently very high and well above expectations.'  Cardiff High School is a Green Category school and in Standards Group 1.  It was also ranked Number 1 in the most recent Real Schools Guide.  In 2016, GCSE and A level results were record breaking for the school and placed Cardiff High School as the top achieving school in both the city and across all of Wales for the third year running based on the number of pupils achieving 5 A*-C grades including Mathematics and English.

Building 
The school is equipped to cater for eight form entry. Now, all departments are suited into adjacent rooms. The school also has the following:

 11 Science labs
 5 Design & Technology rooms
 5 IT rooms
 A Home Economics suite including Catering kitchen and Textile rooms
 A Sports Hall, Gymnasium, Dance Studio, Conditioning Suite, 3G pitch and all-weather pitch
 A Learning Resources Centre 
 It library(old staff room) 
 A creative area incorporating recording studio, IT room, music rooms
 Theatre study facilities
 A hall for performance 
 Learning Hub equipped with iPads with tiered seating
 Outdoor Classroom
 Nurture Room
 Ty Celyn-6th Form Centre
 A dining hall and canteen
 Facilities for disabled pupils
 Self Contained Conference Suite

Curriculum 
 Learning and Teaching is at the heart of Cardiff High School and the school places great emphasis on the ethos of 'learning together'.  The philosophy of learning and teaching at Cardiff High School is that learning should be challenging, engaging, and have impact for all.  Growth Mindset and the ability to learn from mistakes is central to the thinking of staff and students alike at the school.
 The school regularly welcomes international visitors and has hosted parties from both Norway and Denmark in recent years.
 Whilst the school is proud of its record of academic achievement, it also places great emphasis on other important features of pupil development, including extra-curricular activities, theatrical and musical opportunities, recreational sports and community links.
 The school has become has prioritized quality of its musical performances and theatrical productions and recent productions of Jesus Christ Superstar, Sweeney Todd and Les Misérables receiving the highest praise from all who have attended.  The annual Christmas Carol Concert highlights the importance of the school in the local community and is attended by staff, parents and community members alike.
 Sporting excellence and opportunity for all is promoted at Cardiff High School and the school has a healthy number of extra-curricular sporting teams.  Pupils regularly receive international honours across a wide range of sports such as Rugby, Football, Netball, Athletics and Cross Country. The school can count among its recent successes the Senior Boys winning the Welsh Cup in Football (2015-2016) and the Senior Girls success in Netball in the President's Cup.  Participation, improvement and achievements are celebrated at the annual Sports Personality awards evening; which was attended in 2016 by Cardiff City Footballer, Aron Gunnarsson.
 A key objective for the school is the continued drive to raise standards of learning and teaching at all level through the promotion and development of effective teaching and learning strategies. The various INSET programs organised by the school enabled internationally renowned educationalist to deliver whole-school INSET on teaching and learning, linked closely to subsequent dialogue and discourse and departmental level.  Over the last few years, celebrated international educationalists such as Bill Rogers and Sir John Jones have visit ed the school and worked with staff.  The school works consistently to improve leadership at all levels across the school so that every member of staff has the opportunity to develop personally and professionally.

In popular culture 
Cardiff High School has been the site of filming for multiple episodes of The Sarah Jane Adventures, a Doctor Who spin-off show during 2008 and 2010. Episodes featuring Cardiff High School include "Revenge of the Slitheen", "The Lost Boy" and "The Nightmare Man".

Notable former pupils 

Notable former pupils include:
 Sir Leszek Borysiewicz – Chief Executive of the Medical Research Council,  Vice-Chancellor of the University of Cambridge
 Harry Bowcott – President, Welsh Rugby Union
 Sir Ronald Bell – twentieth century Conservative Party Member of Parliament (MP)
 Brian Josephson – physicist and Nobel laureate
 Bernice Rubens – author
 Sarah Lark – West End performer, BBC's "I'd do anything" Finalist
 Jeremy Bowen – broadcaster
 Robert Griffiths - General Secretary of the Communist Party of Britain
 Tom Horabin – politician
 Meredydd Hughes - Former Chief Constable, South Yorkshire
 Bob Humphrys – journalist
 John Humphrys – broadcaster
 Anthony Llewellyn – astronaut
 Brian Morris (Lord Morris of Castle Morris) – academic, poet and member of the House of Lords
 Joan Oxland – artist, teacher
 Christopher Pelling – Regius Professor of Greek, Oxford University
 Joanna Penberthy – first female bishop in the Church in Wales
 Jon Ronson – journalist, author, documentary filmmaker and radio presenter
 Goronwy Rees – Welsh journalist, academic and writer
 John Seys-Llewellyn – Barrister prosecuting during the Nuremberg Trials
 Michael Shepherd CBE – psychiatrist, former professor of epidemiological psychiatry
 Joanna Simpson – journalist and TV broadcaster at ITV
 Craig Thomas – writer
 Mark Andrews - WWE Wrestler
 James Down – professional rugby player

Uniform policy 
Until recently, the school maintained a strict gender-orientated dress code. As of recent, however, the school has switched to a gender-neutral dress code, causing some protest, especially around skirts and whether or not girls have to wear them. This new uniform has black jumpers and trousers, a mostly black blazer with some red and a white shirt.

References

External links 
 

Secondary schools in Cardiff
Educational institutions established in 1895
1895 establishments in Wales